Jean-Brice Wadriako (born 15 February 1993) is a New Caledonian footballer who plays for AS Magenta.

International career

International goals
Scores and results list New Caledonia's goal tally first.

Honours 
AS Magenta
Winner
 New Caledonia Super Ligue (2): 2014, 2015

References

External links 
 

1993 births
Living people
New Caledonian footballers
AS Magenta players
New Caledonia international footballers
Association football defenders
2016 OFC Nations Cup players